Table Rock State Park is a public recreation area in the U.S. state of Missouri consisting of  located in Taney County and Stone County on Table Rock Lake along the southern side of the city of Branson. The state park's facilities include a marina, campgrounds, and trails for hiking and bicycling.

References

External links
Table Rock State Park Missouri Department of Natural Resources
Table Rock State Park Map Missouri Department of Natural Resources

State parks of Missouri
State parks of the U.S. Interior Highlands
Protected areas of Stone County, Missouri
Protected areas established in 1959
Protected areas of Taney County, Missouri